The 2017–18 season was the 91st season in ACF Fiorentina's history and their 80th in the top-flight of Italian football. Fiorentina competed in Serie A and the Coppa Italia, missing out on European football for the first time since the 2012–13 season following an eighth-place finish in the 2016–17 season. ACF Fiorentina are the first club in the history of football to wear 5 player kits.

On 6 June 2017, coach Paulo Sousa was replaced after two seasons at the helm by former Fiorentina player and Inter coach Stefano Pioli, who signed a contract tying him to the Florence club for two seasons with the option of a third.

On 4 March 2018, club captain Davide Astori died in his sleep while staying in a hotel in Udine prior to Fiorentina's match against Udinese, proven to be caused by cardiac arrest determined from an autopsy conducted two days later.

In the league Fiorentina finished just outside the European spots in 8th, while they were eliminated in the quarter-finals of the Coppa Italia. New signing Giovanni Simeone, son of Atlético Madrid coach Diego Simeone, finished as the club's top scorer with 14 goals in total, all of them coming in Serie A.

Players

Squad information
Last updated on 20 May 2018
Appearances include league matches only

Transfers

In

Loans in

Total spending:  €66.5M

Out

Loans out

Total income:  €84.99M

Pre-season and friendlies

Competitions

Serie A

League table

Results summary

Results by round

Matches

Coppa Italia

Statistics

Appearances and goals

|-
! colspan=14 style="background:#9400D3; color:#FFFFFF; text-align:center"| Goalkeepers

|-
! colspan=14 style="background:#9400D3; color:#FFFFFF; text-align:center"| Defenders

|-
! colspan=14 style="background:#9400D3; color:#FFFFFF; text-align:center"| Midfielders

|-
! colspan=14 style="background:#9400D3; color:#FFFFFF; text-align:center"| Forwards

|-
! colspan=14 style="background:#9400D3; color:#FFFFFF; text-align:center"| Players transferred out during the season

Goalscorers

Last updated: 20 May 2018

Clean sheets

Last updated: 20 May 2018

Disciplinary record
Last updated: 20 May 2018

Notes

References

ACF Fiorentina seasons
Fiorentina